Jina Devi Chongtham (born 3 February 1987) is an Indian judoka.  She competed in the half-heavyweight (78 kg) class at the 2014 Commonwealth Games in Glasgow.

References

Living people
1987 births
Sportswomen from Manipur
Martial artists from Manipur
Indian female judoka
Indian female martial artists
21st-century Indian women
21st-century Indian people
Judoka at the 2014 Commonwealth Games
Commonwealth Games competitors for India